Rustam Khan Khoyski (1888–1948) was an Azerbaijani statesman who served as the Minister of Social Security of Azerbaijan Democratic Republic and was member of Azerbaijani National Council. Rustam Khan was the younger brother of a prominent Azerbaijani politician Fatali Khan Khoyski.

Early years
After completing Elisabethpol Gimnasium, he graduated from the Law Department of Saint Petersburg State University in 1913. He then worked as a judge assistant in Ganja and Baku. Rustam Khan is recognized as one of the activists of the Azerbaijani Independence Movement.

Political career
After establishment of Azerbaijan Democratic Republic on 28 May 1918 he worked as the Director of State Issues Department of Council of Ministers of ADR. When his brother Fatali Khan Khoyski formed the third cabinet of ADR, Rustam Khan was appointed the Minister of Social Security. After Bolshevik take over of Azerbaijan, Khoyski remained in the country and served as Chairman of the Azerbaijan SSR Economic Council Board. In the following years, he also worked as a corporate lawyer in Baku and Moscow. He died in Moscow in 1948. Rustam Khan Khoyski was buried at the Novodevichy Cemetery.

See also
Azerbaijani National Council
Cabinets of Azerbaijan Democratic Republic (1918-1920)
Current Cabinet of Azerbaijan Republic

References

1888 births
1948 deaths
Azerbaijan Democratic Republic politicians
Government ministers of Azerbaijan
Soviet rehabilitations
Jurists from Ganja, Azerbaijan
Politicians from Ganja, Azerbaijan
Burials at Novodevichy Cemetery
Azerbaijani people of Iranian descent
Khoyski family